Quantock Row  is a historic row house in Savannah, Georgia, United States. It comprises the six homes from 114 to 124 West Taylor Street, in the northeastern residential block of Chatham Square, and was completed in 1852. It is a contributing property of the Savannah Historic District, itself on the National Register of Historic Places. The row partly fills the block between Barnard Street to the west and Whitaker Street to the east and sits directly opposite Gordon Row.

The properties were built for Allen William Quantock.

Other similar-style row houses exist in Savannah's Scudder's Row, Gordon Row, the Jones Street Quantock Row, William Remshart Row House, McDonough Row and Marshall Row.

Gallery

References

See also
Buildings in Savannah Historic District

Houses in Savannah, Georgia
Houses completed in 1852
Chatham Square (Savannah) buildings
Savannah Historic District